Violin Concerto in A minor, Op. 54 was written by Danish composer Knudåge Riisager in 1950–1951 for violinist , to whom it is dedicated. Tworek gave its first performance with conductor Nicolai Malko at a Thursday Concert on 11 October 1951. The approximate duration is 23 minutes.

Structure
The concerto has only two movements, a calm, meditative Tranquillo and a brilliant Vivo, the latter being in the sonata form.

Recordings
 (1973.V) , Aarhus Symphony Orchestra,  — (2009) DANACORD DACOCD 467-468
 (2017.VI) Ian van Rensburg, Aarhus Symphony Orchestra, Andreas Delfs — (2019) dacapo 8.226145

References

External links
Claus Røllum-Larsen. Booklet notes to dacapo 8.226145

Compositions by Knudåge Riisager
Riisager
Compositions in A minor
1951 compositions